Prototherium is a genus of extinct sirenian related to the dugong. It is known from middle (Bartonian) and upper Eocene deposits in Italy and Spain. Type species is P. veronenses (Zigno, 1887)
 
Three species are now included in the genus, but their phylogenetic relations are not resolved and possibly one of them Prototherium intermedium Bizzotto 1983 must be excluded. In the same way, relations between Prototherium and other genus are confused and need revision. A third species was described in Spain in 2016, P.ausetanum.

Related species 
Metaxytherium
Rytiodus

See also 

Evolution of sirenians

References

Paleogene mammals of Europe
Eocene sirenians
Fossil taxa described in 1887
Prehistoric placental genera